Bengt Fasteraune (born 3 June 1964) is a Norwegian politician for the Centre Party.

He served as a deputy representative to the Parliament of Norway from Oppland during the term 2017–2021. When regular representative Ivar Odnes died in October 2018, Fasteraune took his place as a regular. He assumed a seat in the Standing Committee on Transport and Communications. Hailing from Dovre, he served as mayor there from 2007 to 2018.

References

1966 births
Living people
People from Dovre
Mayors of places in Oppland
Centre Party (Norway) politicians
Members of the Storting